Red Pitaya is a project intended to be alternative for many expensive laboratory measurement and control instruments. It is known as open-source, though the hardware design is proprietary.

Description
It has two 125MS/s RF input and two 125MS/s RF outputs, with 50 MHz analogue bandwidth and 14 bit analog-to-digital (ADC) and digital-to-analog converters. The software includes oscilloscope, spectrum analyzer, signal generator, LCR meter (the LCR add on costs an additional 400 euros), and 50 MHz 2x2 MIMO PID controller. It can be re-programmed to become other devices, as all the IO ports are connected to a common field-programmable gate array (FPGA). There are also auxiliary ADC (250kS/s) and digital IO.

It has three USB 2.0 ports, Wi-Fi, Ethernet connector. Internally, it uses Linux as operating system. The mass storage device for the operating system is a micro-SD card.

Due to the wide bandwidth of the ADC and DAC, the Red Pitaya can be used as a software-defined radio receiver and transmitter and in other radio frequency applications. HAMLAB, a fully featured SDR HF transceiver with an output power of 10 W based on the Red Pitaya board is released in the amateur radio market in October 2016.

Although the software (including HDL source code) for this project is made freely available, the device is not a fully Open Source Hardware project, because the device's electrical schematics are not made openly available.

See also
 ARM Cortex-A9
 Raspberry Pi
 Arduino

References

External links
 
 RedPitaya STEMLab 125-14 specifications

ARM-based single-board computers
Educational hardware
Linux-based devices
Single-board computers
Products introduced in 2013